"Forever in Love" is a song recorded by Belgian vocal trance and europop group Sylver. It was released in April 2001 as the third single from their debut album, Chances, reaching the top 10 in Germany and Romania.

Track listing
 "Forever In Love" (radio edit) – 2:43
 "Forever In Love" (Green Court radio edit) – 3:40
 "Forever In Love" (Green Court remix) – 7:47
 "Forever In Love" (original mix) – 4:16
 "Forever In Love" (3 Drives club mix) – 7:05

Charts

Weekly charts

Year-end charts

References

2001 singles
Sylver songs
2001 songs